The Vis-en-Artois Memorial is a World War I memorial located near the commune of Vis-en-Artois, in the Pas-de-Calais département of France. The memorial lists 9,843 names of British and South African soldiers with no known grave who were killed during the Advance to Victory, from 8 August 1918 to the Armistice (11 November 1918). The area of the frontline covered is described as "in Picardy and Artois, between the Somme and Loos". Canadian, Australian and New Zealand forces that fell during this period and were not found, are commemorated elsewhere on other memorials to the missing.

The memorial has a screen wall in three parts on which are carved the names of the missing listed by regiment. The central screen is flanked by 70-foot high columns, with a Stone of Remembrance at centre. The carvings include one representing St George and the Dragon. The memorial was designed by the architect J. R. Truelove, with sculpture by Ernest Gillick. The memorial was unveiled on 4 August 1930 by the Rt. Hon. Thomas Shaw. Shaw, a Labour Party MP and cabinet minister, was present in his role as British Secretary of State for War. Also present was General Walter Braithwaite, who had served in the Mediterranean and on the Western Front during the war.

See also
Vis-en-Artois British Cemetery, Haucourt

References

External links
Photographs of the cemetery and memorial (includes the dedicatory inscription)

Commonwealth War Graves Commission memorials
World War I memorials in France
Buildings and structures completed in 1930
Monuments and memorials in the Pas-de-Calais